Troas may refer to:

Places 
 The Troad, historical name for a region in the northwestern part of Anatolia
 Alexandria Troas, a Hellenistic and Roman city in Anatolia
 Troaș, a village in Săvârșin Commune, Arad County, Romania
 Troaș, a river in Arad County, Romania

People 
 Troas, queen of Epirus, wife of king Arymbas
 Troas, princess of Epirus, daughter of king Aeacides and queen Phthia